Paragrilus is a genus of beetles in the family Buprestidae, the jewel beetles.

These beetles are native to the Americas. They are dark in color and not very shiny in texture. At least one group of species in this genus is commonly found on plants of the genus Sida.

Species include:

 Paragrilus abjunctus Kerremans, 1903
 Paragrilus acuticostis Obenberger, 1924
 Paragrilus aeneifrons Kerremans, 1896
 Paragrilus aeneus Obenberger, 1924
 Paragrilus aeraticollis Waterhouse, 1889
 Paragrilus akersorum Hespenheide, 2002
 Paragrilus alutaceidorsis Obenberger, 1924
 Paragrilus angulaticollis Waterhouse, 1889
 Paragrilus argentinus Obenberger, 1924
 Paragrilus azureus Hespenheide, 2002
 Paragrilus bergi Kerremans, 1903
 Paragrilus beskei (Gory & Laporte, 1837)
 Paragrilus bicarinicollis Cobos, 1976
 Paragrilus bolivianus Moore, 1986
 Paragrilus bonariensis Obenberger, 1924
 Paragrilus brasiliensis (Gory & Laporte, 1837)
 Paragrilus bruchi Kerremans, 1903
 Paragrilus burkei Hespenheide, 2002
 Paragrilus cavinus Fisher, 1925
 Paragrilus coerulans Obenberger, 1924
 Paragrilus crassus Kerremans, 1897
 Paragrilus credulus Kerremans, 1897
 Paragrilus cupricollis Cobos, 1976
 Paragrilus dormitzeri Obenberger, 1924
 Paragrilus dubius Saunders, 1871
 Paragrilus embrikiellus Obenberger, 1936
 Paragrilus exiguus (Chevrolat, 1835)
 Paragrilus fallorum Hespenheide, 2002
 Paragrilus gestroi Obenberger, 1924
 Paragrilus heliocarpi Hespenheide, 2002
 Paragrilus holomelas Fisher, 1925
 Paragrilus ignotus Obenberger, 1924
 Paragrilus impressus (Chevrolat, 1835)
 Paragrilus kheili Obenberger, 1924
 Paragrilus laevicollis Waterhouse, 1889
 Paragrilus lesueuri Waterhouse, 1889
 Paragrilus major Kerremans, 1897
 Paragrilus modicoides Obenberger, 1924
 Paragrilus modicus (Solier, 1833)
 Paragrilus moldenkei Hespenheide, 2002
 Paragrilus mrazi Obenberger, 1924
 Paragrilus nanulus (Mannerheim, 1837)
 Paragrilus nickerli Obenberger, 1924
 Paragrilus nigritus Kerremans, 1899
 Paragrilus obliquus Kerremans, 1903
 Paragrilus oculatus Cobos, 1976
 Paragrilus opacipennis Fisher, 1925
 Paragrilus paulensis Obenberger, 1924
 Paragrilus percautus (Kerremans, 1903)
 Paragrilus peruvianus (Gory & Laporte, 1837)
 Paragrilus pulchellus Fisher, 1925
 Paragrilus punctifrons Obenberger, 1924
 Paragrilus purpureus Fisher, 1925
 Paragrilus reichei (Gory, 1841)
 Paragrilus rugatulus Thomson, 1879
 Paragrilus similis Obenberger, 1924
 Paragrilus strandi Obenberger, 1924
 Paragrilus sulcicollis Kerremans, 1903
 Paragrilus tenuis (LeConte, 1863)
 Paragrilus transitorius Waterhouse, 1889
 Paragrilus trifoveolatus Waterhouse, 1889
 Paragrilus vianai Obenberger, 1947
 Paragrilus vicinus Waterhouse, 1889

References

Buprestidae genera